The 1977 Bulgarian Cup Final was the 37th final of the Bulgarian Cup (in this period the tournament was named Cup of the Soviet Army), and was contested between Levski Sofia and Lokomotiv Sofia on 12 June 1977 at Vasil Levski National Stadium in Sofia. Levski won the final 2–1.

Match

Details

See also
1976–77 A Group

References

Bulgarian Cup finals
PFC Levski Sofia matches
Cup Final